Season 2 of Fast N' Loud started on February 18, 2013, at 9 p.m. EST.

Richard decides he has outgrown the shop on Reeder Road, and leases for $6500 per month a much bigger building nearby on Merrell Road in Dallas, Texas, where Gas Monkey Garage can work on more cars at once. They hire new mechanics to help with the extra work, as well as a couple more people to help with buying parts and looking for cars to buy for future projects. The actual move took place in January 2013.

Episodes

References

2013 American television seasons